Helen Harris may refer to:
 Helen Hodge Harris, American aviator
 Helen Webb Harris, American golf club founder
 Helen Petousis-Harris, New Zealand vaccinologist
 Helen Harris, a character in the novel Ready Player One